Tiny Toon Adventures: Buster's Hidden Treasure is the first Tiny Toon Adventures-based game released on the Sega Genesis. It was released in 1993 and developed and published by Konami. The game was not released in Japan, but was released in South Korea, where it was simply called just Tiny Toons Adventures.

Gameplay
Buster Bunny's mission in this game is to trace down and defeat Montana Max, who has stolen and hidden some treasure and rescue Babs Bunny. Many foes are in the way, including Roderick Rat and Gene Splicer, who has brainwashed several of Buster's friends, including Plucky Duck, Hamton J. Pig, Dizzy Devil and Calamity Coyote. Upon defeating Gene, the helmet controlling Buster's friends will fall off and explode, leaving them dazed or to fall down in a comical fashion (in the case of Calamity Coyote).

To complete each level, Buster must find Gogo Dodo, who will allow him to enter a portal. Additionally, Buster can find portals reminiscent of the show's rainbow-coloured logo, that will take Buster into Wackyland in the form of a bonus level. Here, Buster must attempt to collect as many items as he can before touching one of the numerous Dodos that populate the level.

Reception

MegaTech magazine praised the graphics and sound, and many levels to explore in different landscapes such as woods and snow. Power Unlimited gave a review score of 90% writing: "Buster's Hidden Treasure is a lot of fun to play and good looking. The game is big and varied. Unfortunately, the sound isn't that great, and you can only play as Buster Bunny."

References

External links

Sega-16 Review Review of the game.

1993 video games
Konami games
Platform games
Sega Genesis games
Sega Genesis-only games
Single-player video games
Video games based on Tiny Toon Adventures
Video games scored by Tsuyoshi Sekito
Video games developed in Japan